In United States agricultural policy, permitted acreage refers to the acreage on which a farm program participant was permitted to grow a program crop after satisfying acreage reduction requirements. Limits on production were eliminated under the 2002 farm bill (P.L. 101-171) through crop year 2007, as also was done under the 1996 farm bill (P.L. 104-127).

References 

United States Department of Agriculture